Anna Cora Mowatt Ritchie (Ogden; after first marriage, Mowatt; after second marriage, Ritchie; pseudonyms, Isabel, Henry C. Browning, and Helen Berkley; March 5, 1819July 21, 1870) was a French-born American author, playwright, public reader, actress, and preservationist. Her best known work was the play Fashion, published in 1845. Following her critical success as a playwright, she enjoyed a successful career on stage as an actress. Her Autobiography of an Actress was published in 1853. Anna Cora Mowatt played a central role in lobbying and fundraising during the early years of the Mount Vernon Ladies' Association, the oldest national historic preservation organization in the United States.

Childhood 
Anna Cora Ogden was born in Bordeaux, France, on March 5, 1819. She was the tenth of fourteen children. Her father was Samuel Gouveneur Ogden (1779–1860), an American merchant. Her mother was Eliza Lewis Ogden (1785–1836), granddaughter of Francis Lewis, a signatory to the United States Declaration of Independence. In 1826, when Anna was six years old, the Ogden family returned to the United States. She attended private schools but was primarily educated at home. From a young age she was encouraged to read and showed a passion for writing and acting.

Career 

On October 6, 1834, at age 15, Anna Cora Ogden eloped with James Mowatt (1805–1851), a New York lawyer. They moved to an estate in Flatbush, New York, where her husband encouraged her to continue her education and to write.  She wrote of her elopement:

Anna Cora Mowatt's first book, Pelayo, or The Cavern of Covadonga, was published in 1836, then Reviewers Reviewed in 1837 using the pseudonym "Isabel". She wrote articles which were published in Graham's Magazine and Godey's Lady's Book and other periodicals. She wrote a six-act play, Gulzara, which was published in New World. Under the pseudonym Henry C. Browning, she wrote a biography of Goethe. Using the pseudonym "Helen Berkley", she wrote two novels: The Fortune Hunter and Evelyn. Evelyn is written in the epistolary style. In 1841, due to financial problems, Anna became a public reader. Her first performance was attended by Edgar Allan Poe, who wrote of her, "A more radiantly beautiful smile is quite impossible to conceive." Her readings were popular and well attended, but her career as a reader was short lived due to respiratory problems. While recovering from her illness, she returned to her writing.

In 1845, her best-known work, the play Fashion was published. It received rave reviews and opened at the Park Theatre, New York, on March 24, 1845. On June 13, 1845, she made another career move to acting, she debuted at the Park Theatre as Pauline in The Lady of Lyons with great success. Although her next play, Armand, the Child of the People was published in 1847, and also received good reviews, she continued in her acting career. She performed leading roles in Shakespeare (for instance, in a production of Cymbeline in London, 1843), melodramas, and her own plays. She toured the United States and Europe for the next eight years.

On February 15, 1851, her husband, James Mowatt died. After a short break she resumed her acting career. In December 1853, her book Autobiography of an Actress was published. Anna Cora Mowatt's last appearance on the public stage was June 3, 1854.

Later years 
On June 7, 1853, Anna married William Foushee Ritchie (? – 1868), son of Thomas Ritchie. Their wedding was a lavish affair, attended by President of the United States, Franklin Pierce and his Cabinet. During the next few years she wrote two more novels, Mimic Life, published in 1855 and Twin Roses, published in 1857. She played a prominent role in raising funds for the preservation of George Washington's home, Mount Vernon, serving as secretary of the Central Committee of the early Mount Vernon Ladies' Association. Anna left her husband in 1860 and moved to Europe. She wrote the novel Mute Singer, published in 1861. She wrote Fairy Fingers, published in 1865. In 1865, she moved to England, where she wrote The Clergyman's Wife, and Other Sketches in 1867. Anna Cora Ogden Mowatt Ritchie died in Twickenham, England, on July 21, 1870. She is buried in Kensal Green Cemetery in London, beside her first husband, James Mowatt.

References

Bibliography

Further reading

External links 
 The Lady Actress: The Life and Career of Anna Cora Mowatt -an up-to-date summary by a Mowatt scholar, including a historical timeline for context and a digital bibliography of online Mowatt resources

 
 
 
 Complete text of her play, Fashion

1819 births
1870 deaths
19th-century American novelists
19th-century American actresses
19th-century American women writers
19th-century American dramatists and playwrights
French emigrants to the United States
American women novelists
American stage actresses
Burials at Kensal Green Cemetery
American expatriates in the United Kingdom
People from Flatbush, Brooklyn
Actresses from New York City
American women dramatists and playwrights
Writers from Brooklyn
Novelists from New York (state)
Wikipedia articles incorporating text from A Woman of the Century
19th-century pseudonymous writers
Pseudonymous women writers